Kochi Blue Spikers, commonly known as KBS, is a men's volleyball team from Kochi, Kerala playing in the Prime Volleyball League in India. The team was founded in 2018 and owned by Muthoot Pappachan Group. The team had participated in the only season of the dissolved Pro Volleyball League in 2019 before it switched to Prime Volleyball League in 2021.

Honors
 Pro Volleyball League
 Third Place: 2019

History

2019 season
In mid-2018, Volleyball Federation of India along with Baseline Ventures, India invited bids for franchisees based in Indian cities for Pro Volleyball League. The league was given the go-ahead by FIVB. Thomas Muthoot of the Muthoot Pappachan Group won the bid for the Kochi franchisee in the Pro Volleyball League

Blue Spikers picked India
international Prabagaran as their icon player for 1.20 million rupees. They also secured the services of India Captain, Mohan Ukkrapandian. USA
international David Lee, who has won both the Olympic Gold medal and the World cup was their foreign pick. Lee expressed his thrill to join Kochi and expected that the league will do a world of good to the players and its fans.

Team

Current team

Administration and support staff

References 

Men's volleyball teams
Volleyball in India
Sports clubs in India
Muthoot Group